The Syro Malabar Catholic Eparchy of Kanjirappally-Nilackal is a Syro-Malabar Catholic eparchy with an area of 1980 km2 comprising the Kanjirappally taluk in Kottayam district and a few villages of the neighbouring taluks in Kottayam district, northern Pathanamthitta district, and parts of Idukki district of central Kerala in South India.

The Eparchy of Kanjirappally-Nilackal was erected by Pope Paul VI with the bull "Nos Beati Petri Successores" in February 1977, which separated the eastern part of the Archeparchy of Changanassery and erected the new eparchy of Kanjirapally-Nilackal, as a suffragan of the same Archeparchy. Mar Jose Pulickal is the current bishop, serving since January 2020. Mar Mathew Arackal is the bishop emeritus of the eparchy, who served from 2001 to 2020.
Mary Matha Minor seminary is the heart of kanjirapally diocese.

List of Parishes

Saints and causes for canonisation
 Servant of God Bernhard Thanhauser (Fortunatus)

See also
 Saint Thomas Christian

References

External links
Diocese of Kanjirappally
Church profile
Catholic-Hierarchy entry

 
Kanjirappally
Kanjirappally
Christian organizations established in 1977
Roman Catholic dioceses and prelatures established in the 20th century
Dioceses in Kerala
1977 establishments in Kerala
Churches in Kottayam district